The James and Constance Alsop Professorship of Music at the University of Liverpool was established in 1946; prior to that time, music teaching had been confined to the Department of Education but the new chair marked an attempt to "coordinate the study of music within the University and stimulate interest by lectures and other appropriate instruction". The first holder was Gerald Abraham, who had been director of the BBC's Gramophone Department. The chair was named for Alderman James W. Alsop, OBE, a major figure in the university's establishment and early administration.

The chair replaced the James W. Alsop Lectureship, which had been established by Alsop's widow Constance in 1924; she endowed it with the sum of £3,000. Appointments were made for a year "it having been decided at present [by 1928] to invite each year a distinguished musician to deliver a course of public lectures on Music". The lectureship was suspended during the Second World War; once the chair was established, the lectures were given by the professor and after Basil Smallman's appointment in 1965 they were reformed into the Alsop Concerts.

James W. Alsop Lectureship 
 1925: Gustav Holst.
 1926: Sir George Dyson, KCVO.
 1927: William Gillies Whittaker.
 1928: Sir Percy C. Buck.
 1929: William Gillies Whittaker.
 1930: Thomas F. Dunhill.
 1931: Sir Hamilton Harty.
 1932: Canon E. H. Fellowes, CH, MVO.
 1933: Geoffrey Shaw.
 1934: Ernest Newman.
 1935: J. F. Toye.
 1936: Sir Stanley Marchant, CVO, FSA.
 1937: Sir Donald Tovey.
 1938: Albert Coates.

James and Constance Alsop Professors of Music 
 1947–1962: Gerald Ernest Heal Abraham, CBE, FBA.
 1964–1985: (Frederic) Basil (Rowley) Smallman.
 1986–2003: Michael Owen Talbot, FBA.
2005–2015: Anahid Kassabian.
2017–present: Sara Cohen.

References

Notes

Citations 

University of Liverpool